Paradise is the fifth album by TQ originally scheduled for release in 2007, but with many delays, was pushed back and finally released on April 29, 2008.

Track listing

Credits
All Guitars by Ricky Rouse.
All Drums by Trevor Lawrence.
Additional Programming by Terrance Quaites
Executive Producer: Dorian (Lil D) Washington And Tony Bucher for Gracie Production
Co-Executive Producer : Terrance (TQ) Quaites & Theresa Price
A&R Dorian (Lil D) Washington

References

TQ (singer) albums
2008 albums